The Northern Territory Nationals were a political party active in the Northern Territory in the late 1980s. The party was not affiliated with the National Party of Australia, whose NT affiliate was the Country Liberal Party. The party was however associated with the National Party of Queensland-supported Joh for Canberra push.

After the 1987 election they were represented in the Assembly by former Chief Minister and CLP leader Ian Tuxworth.

They gained a second seat when Enzo Floreani won a by-election in the seat of Flynn in 1988.  However, a redistribution ahead of the 1990 election erased Tuxworth's majority in Barkly and abolished Flynn altogether.  Tuxworth tried to transfer to the new seat of Goyder, but lost to the CLP's Terry McCarthy.  Floreani tried to transfer to Araluen, and was heavily defeated by CLP incumbent Eric Poole.  The NT Nationals faded away soon afterward.

Nationals